Vahé Oshagan (Վահէ Օշական) (Plovdiv, Bulgaria 1922 – Philadelphia June 30, 2000) was an Armenian poet, writer, literary critic.

Life 
Vahé Oshagan was born in 1922. His father, Hagop Oshagan, was a prominent writer and critic. Raised in Cairo, Jerusalem, and Cyprus, he studied in France and received a doctorate in comparative literature from the University of Sorbonne, in Paris.

Like many Armenians, whose villages and homes were destroyed by the Turks in 1915, Oshagan drifted throughout the Middle East and Europe, never finding a permanent home. He lived in Beirut after 1952 and taught philosophy and psychology, as well as Armenian, French and English literature. He was again uprooted at the start of the Lebanese civil war in 1975 and forced to move to Philadelphia, where he taught at the University of Pennsylvania from 1976-1982. The American cityscape became a focus of his work, as exemplified by his volume Alert (Ահազանգ) (1980).

In the 1990s, he taught at the University of Stepanakert during the war of Karabagh. He later lectured at Macquarie University in Sydney, Australia, from 1993-1998. He was a prolific contributor of the Armenian press in the Diaspora, from Beirut to California, during half a century. His essays on literary, cultural, and political issues may fill several volumes.

Literary output
Vahe Oshagan, who also wrote short stories and novels, "reformed Armenian poetry by rejecting its imposed formality, which shunned the concerns of daily life and themes of alienation and loss." He often wrote in colloquial language and was for many the voice of the Armenian diaspora. His second book, The City (Քաղաքը), published in 1963, became "the most radical book of Armenian poetry in the 20th century," according to Marc Nichanian, a former professor of Armenian studies at Columbia University.

He was heavily influenced by French existentialists and had little time for those who dismissed modernity as a corruption of traditional values. "Oshagan was a living paradox: a rebel, a champion of individual liberty, and a one-man repository of his nation's rich heritage. He saw in the survival and creativity of his people reason to dispel their fears and confusions, and offer real hope for the future."
He was also the editor in chief of the literary journal Raft: an Annual of Poetry and Criticism, between 1987 and 1998. The journal published English translations of Armenian poetry, as well as essays and reviews.
Many leading critics considered Oshagan the most important Armenian-language poet in exile. Nichanian has called Vahe Oshagan "the most important poet of his generation." According to him, "for a long time his work was not even accepted as poetry. He had a hard time imposing himself as poet."

None of Vahe Oshagan's work has been published in English. A translation of his book Alert by British poet Peter Reading awaits publication.

Selected works
 Պատուհան (Window), 1956
 Քաղաք (The City), 1963
 Քառուղի (Crossroads), 1971
 Ահազանգ (Alert), 1980
 Խուճապ (Panic), 1983
 Փախստականը (The Fugitive), 1987
 Թակարդին շուրջ (Around the Trap), 1988
 Դէպի ինքնութիւն (Towards Identity)

References

http://www.nytimes.com/2000/07/09/nyregion/vahe-oshagan-78-pioneer-of-a-new-armenian-poetry.html

1922 births
2000 deaths
Writers from Plovdiv
University of Paris alumni
University of Pennsylvania faculty
20th-century Armenian poets
Bulgarian people of Armenian descent
Armenian male poets
20th-century male writers
Bulgarian expatriates in Egypt
Bulgarian expatriates in Cyprus
Expatriates in Mandatory Palestine
Bulgarian expatriates in France
Bulgarian expatriates in Lebanon
Bulgarian emigrants to the United States